Kirk Dam is an impounding dam, located 1.5 kilometres south of Rothesay, and is separated by a causeway from the much larger Loch Fad to the south-west.  It was built to provide water to the cotton mills of the town, and is now the habitat for a variety of marshland birds. The earthfill dam is 6 metres high and records show it was constructed in the late 18th century.

See also
 List of reservoirs and dams in the United Kingdom

References

External links
"Argyll and Bute Council Reservoirs Act 1975 Public Register"
Bathymetrical Survey of the Fresh-Water Lochs of Scotland, 1897-1909

Reservoirs in Argyll and Bute
1700s in Scotland
Dams in Scotland
Isle of Bute
Dams completed in the 18th century